Otis Elevator Company Building may refer to:

Otis Elevator Company Building (San Francisco, California), listed on the National Register of Historic Places (NRHP) in San Francisco, California
Otis Elevator Company Factory Building, Chicago, Illinois, listed on the National Register of Historic Places in Chicago, Illinois
Otis Elevator Company Building (Portland, Oregon), NRHP-listed
Otis Building a 16-story high rise at 10 South LaSalle Street in Chicago, Illinois, begun in 1913 and now demolished